Edmond Butler, 2nd Baron Cahir (died 1560) was the son of Thomas Butler, 1st Baron Cahir and the grandson of Thomas Butler of Cahir. The title became extinct upon his death but was revived in favour of his first cousin, Theobald Butler, 1st Baron Cahir (of the second creation).

See also
 Butler dynasty

References

Year of birth uncertain
Edmund
1560 deaths
16th-century Irish people
Barons in the Peerage of Ireland